Spheconisca is a genus of lichen-forming fungi in the family Verrucariaceae. It has about 20 species. The genus, first proposed as a subdivision of Moriola in 1872 by Johannes M. Norman was promoted by him to generic status four years later, but without assigning a type species.

References

Verrucariales
Eurotiomycetes genera
Lichen genera
Taxa described in 1876